Today is a 2012 French-Senegalese film directed by Alain Gomis. The film competed in competition at the 62nd Berlin International Film Festival in February 2012.

Plot
Satché is about to die. He decides to make his last day on this world the day of his life.

Cast 
 Saul Williams as Satché
 Djolof Mbengue as Sele
 Anisia Uzeyman as Rama
 Aïssa Maïga as Nella
 Mariko Arame as Satché's mother
 Alexandre Gomis as Lexou
 Frank M. Ahearn as himself

References

External links

2012 films
2012 drama films
French drama films
Senegalese drama films
2010s French-language films
2010s French films